Don Martin (born September 12, 1956) is a retired Canadian journalist, best known as a former Calgary Herald columnist, television pundit and television show host on CTV News Channel.

Life and career
Martin was born in Rochester, New York, the son of Mary and George Martin, an insurance company executive. His family moved to Pickering, Ontario in the early 1960s where Martin attended Pickering High School before graduating from the journalism program at Ryerson Polytechnical Institute.

Newspaper career
In 1978, Martin was hired by the Calgary Herald newspaper where he began a 22-year career as city hall bureau chief, 1988 Winter Olympics bureau chief and civic affairs columnist. In 1993, he was transferred to Edmonton as the newspaper’s provincial affairs columnist. In 2000, he relocated to Ottawa as the Calgary Herald’s national affairs columnist, syndicated opinion writer for the Southam newspaper chain and regular on-air contributor to CBC, CTV and CPAC political shows.

In 2008, Martin published a column criticizing the campaign of former journalist Arthur Kent for a seat in the Legislative Assembly of Alberta in the 2008 Alberta general election. The case spent eight years in the courts before the judge found in favour of Kent, awarding him $200,000 in damages, in 2016. Kent was awarded a further $200,000 in damages in 2018, after filing an appeal on the grounds that the initial award was not sufficient to compensate for the damage to his reputation.

Television career
In 2010, CTV hired Martin to host the news channel’s flagship politics show Power Play. In 2012 he received the Public Policy Forum’s Peter Lougheed Award for Public Service in Western Canada. He retired as host of Power Play in December 2019, but continues to write a weekly blog for CTVNews.ca.

Writing
Martin has written two biographies. His first, King Ralph: The Life and Political Success of Ralph Klein, was published in 2002 and became a national bestseller. His second book, Belinda: The Political and Private Life of Belinda Stronach, was published in 2006.

References

External links
CTV News

Canadian columnists
Canadian television news anchors
Living people
Place of birth missing (living people)
National Post people
Canadian political journalists
CTV Television Network people
20th-century Canadian journalists
21st-century Canadian journalists
1956 births
20th-century Canadian non-fiction writers
20th-century Canadian male writers
21st-century Canadian non-fiction writers
21st-century Canadian male writers
Canadian male non-fiction writers
American emigrants to Canada